Chalfilh Legislative Assembly constituency is one of the 40 Legislative Assembly constituencies of Mizoram state in India.

It is part of Aizawl district and is reserved for candidates belonging to the Scheduled tribes.

Members of the Legislative Assembly

Election results

2018

2013

2008

References

Aizawl district
Assembly constituencies of Mizoram